Baltimore General Dispensary is a historic public dispensary building located at Baltimore, Maryland, United States. It opened in 1801 to provide medical and health services to the poor in Baltimore.  It is the oldest institution of its kind in Maryland.  It is three bays wide and two stories high, with running bond red brick foundation and building walls, and a water table constructed in 1911.  The front features a simple cornice surmounting a stone entablature reading: 1801 Baltimore General Dispensary 1911. It is the only surviving building designed for Baltimore's oldest charity.  The interior originally featured a large dispensary center on the first floor, separated for black and white patients. The rooms for surgical and medical aid on the second floor gave the poor a measure of privacy rarely available to charity patients.

Baltimore General Dispensary was listed on the National Register of Historic Places in 1980.

References

External links
, including photo from 1984, at Maryland Historical Trust
Maryland History Online, Medicine in Maryland 1752-1920, Baltimore General Dispensary

Downtown Baltimore
Hospital buildings completed in 1911
Hospitals in Baltimore
Hospital buildings on the National Register of Historic Places in Baltimore
Defunct hospitals in Maryland
Hospitals established in 1801
Neoclassical architecture in Maryland
1911 establishments in Maryland
Dispensaries in the United States